Llangyfelach railway station served the village of Llangyfelach, in the historical county of Glamorganshire, Wales, from 1923 to 1924 on the Swansea District line.

History 
The station was opened on 9 July 1923 by the Great Western Railway. It was a very short-lived station, only being open for 1 year before closing on 22 September 1924.

References 

Disused railway stations in Swansea
Railway stations in Great Britain opened in 1923
Railway stations in Great Britain closed in 1924
1923 establishments in Wales
1924 disestablishments in Wales